Greenbo Lake State Resort Park in Kentucky is a resort park in the northeastern part of the commonwealth, close to the town of Greenup, Kentucky in Greenup County on Kentucky State Route 1. It features a 36-room lodge named for Greenup County resident and writer Jesse Hilton Stuart, a 63-site campground with 35 primitive sites, a swimming pool with slides, two tennis courts, an 18-hole miniature golf course, an amphitheater and a scuba refuge area. The lodge contains a 232-seat dining room. It is centered on the  Greenbo Lake that features a boat dock and marina. The park hosts a variety of community events each year including a quilt show, murder mystery dinner theaters, scrapbooking, and a 5K race.

References

External links 
Greenbo Lake State Resort Park  Kentucky Department of Parks
Greenbo Lake State Resort Park American Byways

State parks of Kentucky
Protected areas of Greenup County, Kentucky
Protected areas established in 1970